Boo Boo was the world's smallest dog from 2007 to 2013.  She stood at a height of 9.65 cm, according to the Guinness Book of World Records.

Boo Boo was replaced by Milly, another Chihuahua, as the World's Smallest Dog.  Other contenders for the record included Beyonce, a Dachshund-Chihuahua mix, and Scooter, a Maltese

See also
 List of individual dogs
 Boo (dog)

References

External links
Miniature Goats As Pets
All About Dogs - Dog Corner
Comfy Winter Coats For Chihuahuas

Individual dogs